Menegazzia megalospora is a species of foliose lichen from South America. It was formally described as a new species in 1942 by Finnish lichenologist Veli Räsänen, as a member of Parmelia. Rolf Santesson transferred it to the genus Menegazzia in 1942.

See also
 List of Menegazzia species

References

megalospora
Lichen species 
Lichens described in 1942
Lichens of South America
Taxa named by Veli Räsänen